Kumarganj Assembly constituency is an assembly constituency in Dakshin Dinajpur district in the Indian state of West Bengal.

Overview
As per orders of the Delimitation Commission, No. 38 Kumarganj Assembly constituency covers Kumarganj community development block and Ashokegram, Basuria, Chaloon and Uday gram panchayats of Gangarampur community development block.

Kumarganj Assembly constituency is part of No. 6 Balurghat (Lok Sabha constituency).

Members of Legislative Assembly

Election results

2021

2011
In the 2011 elections, Mahamuda Begam of Trinamool Congress defeated her nearest rival Mafuja Khatun of CPI(M).

.# Swing calculated on Congress+Trinamool Congress vote percentages taken together in 2006.

1977-2006
In the 2006 and 2001 state assembly elections, Mafuja Khatun of CPI(M) won the Kumarganj assembly seat defeating her nearest rivals Ahmad Ali Sardar and Nani Gopal Roy, both of Trinamool Congress respectively. Contests in most years were multi cornered but only winners and runners are being mentioned. Dwijendra Nath Roy of CPI(M) defeated Parinita Singha Roy of Congress in 1996 and Prabodh Kumar Singha Roy of Congress in 1991. Dwijendra Mondal of CPI(M) defeated Afrabuddin Sarkar of Congress in 1987. Dwijendra Nath Roy of CPI(M) defeated Sekhar Kumar Dasgupta of Congress in 1982. Jamini Kishore Mojumdar of CPI(M) defeated Khalil Sayed of Congress in 1977.

1967–1972
Probodh Kumar Singha Roy of Congress won 1972 and 1971. Abinash Basu of Bangla Congress won in 1969. M.Bose of Congress won in 1967.

References

Assembly constituencies of West Bengal
Politics of Dakshin Dinajpur district